K48 may refer to:

 K-48 (Kansas highway)
 , a Veer-class corvette of the Indian Navy
 Nishi-Shoro Station, in Hokkaido, Japan
 Potassium-48, an isotope of potassium
 Symphony No. 8 (Mozart), by Wolfgang Amadeus Mozart